is a Japanese manga series that was written by Akiyoshi Ohta, and was illustrated by Ushio Mizta. It consists of three volumes released in Japan by MediaWorks and was licensed and released in English by Yen Press.

Plot
Orphaned four years ago by an accident that took her parents and her memory, 16-year-old Momoka Futami travels to Mitsurugi City upon receiving an invitation from the Mitsurugi House, her father's very powerful relatives who offer to take her in. What awaits her far exceeds her fears and expectations-a spiritual sword, Suzukaze, and a tumultuous battle. The Purification, a pillar replacement ceremony, has begun, but the Mitsurugi Clan loses their spiritual swords to Keiya Mano, a member of the Shichou Group. Upon learning that she holds the key to regain the spiritual swords, Momoka becomes overwhelmed by the pressure and runs away. However, with Shouta's encouragement, she decides to face her enemy and her destiny head-on

Characters
Momoka Futami
Orphaned four years ago by an accident that took her parents and her memory, 16-year-old Momoka Futami travels to Mitsurugi City upon receiving an invitation from the Mitsurugi House, her father’s very powerful relatives who offer to take her in. What awaits her far exceeds her fears and expectations-a spiritual sword, Suzukaze, and a tumultuous battle.
Shouta Ichijou
Momoka's roommate

External links
 Kaze No Hana at Yen Press

Dengeki Comic Gao!
Shōnen manga
Yen Press titles